Snowflake children is a term used by organizations that promote the adoption of frozen embryos left over from in vitro fertilization (IVF) to describe children that result. The embryos are donated by families who have cryopreserved embryos remaining from their IVF treatment that they don't plan to use themselves. The ownership of the embryos is transferred from the donor to the recipient using the best practices of adoption. It is called embryo adoption, although the legal process of taking ownership of an embryo differs from that of traditional adoption.  According to a CBS News article dated July 28, 2005, the term "Snowflake baby" was coined by the first agency to provide the adoption service, Nightlight Christian Adoptions. Their embryo adoption program is called the Snowflakes® Embryo Adoption Program and over 950 babies have been born from this program.

Many other organizations use the term 'snowflake baby' to refer to children born from donated embryos, however, the term Snowflakes® is a registered trademark of Nightlight when it relates to embryo adoption.  

While the term "Snowflake babies" has been used to describe babies born in this manner, the first snowflake children are no longer babies.  According to CBS News, the first snowflake baby was born in 1998.

Former US president George W. Bush has made public appearances together with snowflake children while speaking about his support for adult stem cell research and his opposition to the destruction of human embryos for the purpose of embryonic stem cell research. In his book Decision Points, Bush allowed certain social factions to request and receive Federal funding for genomics, the manufacturing of human life artificially.  He wrote,

Criticism of the term
Members of the Nightlight Christian Adoptions, the Embryo Adoption Awareness Campaign, and Embryos Alive Adoption Agency use the term "snowflake baby" as a synonym for any baby born from an adopted embryo. However, that use of the term and the related term "embryo adoption," are at times controversial in some circles.

References

External links
 Nightlight Christian Adoptions Snowflakes Program
 Embryo Adoption Awareness Campaign
 Embryo Adoption Agency

Fertility medicine
In vitro fertilisation
Adoption
Anti-abortion movement